The Advisory Committee on Mathematics Education (ACME) is a British policy council for the Royal Society based in London, England. Founded in 2002 by the Royal Society and the Joint Mathematical Council, ACME analyzes mathematics education practices and provides advice on education policy. ACME is funded by the Gatsby Charitable Foundation (2002-2015) and the Department for Education.

Members
The committee chair is appointed for a three-year term. As of 2018, the membership is composed of:

 Frank Kelly (Chair)
Martin Bridson
Paul Glaister
Paul Golby
Jeremy Hodgen
Mary McAlinden
Lynne McClure
Emma McCoy
Jil Matheson
David Spiegelhalter
Sally Bridgeland

References

2002 establishments in the United Kingdom
Mathematics education in the United Kingdom